Kordan or Kurdan or Koverdan may refer to:

 Ali Kordan, Iranian politician
 Kordan, Alborz, a village in Alborz Province, Iran
 Koverdan, Bandar Lengeh, a village in Hormozgan Province, Iran
 Kurdan, Bastak, a village in Hormozgan Province, Iran
 Kordan, Kerman, a village in Kerman Province, Iran